KUVA (102.3 FM) is a radio station licensed to serve Uvalde, Texas, United States. The station is owned by Javier Navarro Galindo, through licensee South Texas Radio, LLC.

Until June 29, 2022, KUVA broadcast a Tejano music format.

The station was assigned the call sign KUVA by the Federal Communications Commission on November 2, 1992.

On June 29, 2022, KUVA ceased operations.

References

External links

UVA
Radio stations established in 1984
Uvalde, Texas